Qeytarieh (also spelled Gheytarieh) is an affluent neighbourhood in northern Tehran, located within the larger Shemiran district. Gheytarieh has about 150,000 residents.

Qeytarieh is famous for a large park with the same name. Qeytarieh Park was once the home of a Qajar dynasty minister, Amir Kabir. Qeytarie is known for its many restaurants, including fast food, found along Qeytarieh Street. Gheytarieh has a rather younger population, because of the luxury and new apartments many new couples and single people move to this area. Gheytarieh is one of the most expensive neighbourhoods in Tehran alongside Zaferanieh and Elahieh.

Qeytarieh's neighbouring districts are Niavaran, Kamranieh, Farmanieh, Elahieh and Tajrish.
The reason for the formation of this neighborhood, like most of others neighborhoods in Shemiranat , can be considered as agriculture and horticulture.
Most of the people who settled the neighborhood came here from the city of Boroujerd from the Lorestan Province

Notable people

Morteza Pashaei was a famous musician that lived in Gheytariyeh.

Neighbourhoods in Tehran
Parks in Tehran